Kalat-e Now may refer to:
 Kalat-e Now, Darmian
 Kalat-e Now, Nehbandan